Sir Francis Pratt Winter, CMG (23 February 1848 – 29 March 1919) was chief judicial officer of British New Guinea. He was knighted by letters patent in 1900.

References 

Knights Bachelor
Territory of Papua judges
1848 births
1919 deaths
19th-century Australian lawyers
Companions of the Order of St Michael and St George
Colony of Fiji people
20th-century Australian judges